Euro has been borne by at least three ships of the Italian Navy and may refer to:

 , a  launched in 1900, renamed Strale in 1924 and discarded.
 , a  launched in 1927 and sunk in 1943.
 , a  launched in 1983. 

Italian Navy ship names